Hoseynabad (also Romanized as Ḩoseynābād) is a village in Bushkan Rural District, Bushkan District, Dashtestan County, Bushehr Province, Iran. At the 2006 census, its population was 68, in 14 families.

References 

Populated places in Dashtestan County